Bockratz is a surname. Notable people with the surname include:

 George Eugene Bockrath (1911–1998), American aeronautical engineer
 Joseph T. Bockrath, American legal scholar